Andreas Reisinger (born 14 October 1963) is an Austrian football manager and former player. He is currently in charge of SV Wienerberg.

Club career
Born in Vienna, the midfielder mostly played for hometown clubs, the most prominent being Rapid Wien. He also spent three seasons with SV Casino Salzburg, for whom he played 10 games in their title-winning 1993/1994 season.

International career
Reisinger made his debut for Austria in an April 1989 friendly match against Czechoslovakia and was a participant at the 1990 FIFA World Cup. There is a common misconception that he played as number 22.  However, his actual number was 16.

He earned 10 caps, no goals scored. His final international was an October 1990 European Championship qualification match against Yugoslavia.

Honours
Austrian Football Bundesliga (1):
 1994

External links
Rapid stats - Rapid Archive

References

1963 births
Living people
Austrian footballers
Austria international footballers
1990 FIFA World Cup players
SK Rapid Wien players
FC Red Bull Salzburg players
Austrian Football Bundesliga players
Austrian football managers
Floridsdorfer AC managers
Wiener Sport-Club managers

Association football midfielders
Footballers from Vienna
Favoritner AC players